Eun-sook, also spelled Eun-suk, Un-sook or Un-suk, is a Korean feminine given name. Its meaning differs based on the hanja used to write each syllable of the name. There are 26 hanja with the reading "eun" and 13 hanja with the reading "sook" on the South Korean government's official list of hanja which may be registered for use in given names.

People with this name include:
Sunwoo Eun-sook (born 1959), South Korean actress
Unsuk Chin (born 1961), South Korean composer
Choi Eun-suk (born 1963), South Korean cyclist
Kim Eun-sook (basketball) (born 1963), South Korean former basketball player
Jo Eun-sook (born 1970), South Korean actress
Kim Eun-sook (born 1973), South Korean screenwriter 
Phyo Un-suk (born 1981), North Korean long-distance runner
Choi Eun-sook (born 1986), South Korean épée fencer
Yoo Eun-sook, South Korean voice actor

See also
List of Korean given names

References

Korean feminine given names